Florin Bejan (born 28 March 1991) is a Romanian professional footballer who plays as a central defender for Liga I club FC Hermannstadt.

Club career
Bejan is a product of Steaua Academy, where he came in 2007. From 2009 until 2011 he played for the 'red-blue' second team. In 2011 he signed for FC Viitorul Constanța and in the winter of 2014 he became the player of ASA Târgu Mureș .

In 2015 he was close to conquer the champion title with ASA Târgu Mureș in a very close fight with FC Steaua București, winning the Romania vice-champion title. For almost two seasons he was one of the best players of his team, until 2016 when he moved to Cracovia, in Poland.

In February 2017 he returned to Liga I on loan, playing for the team coached by Dan Alexa, CS Concordia Chiajna and in the summer he signed with Astra Giurgiu for the next two seasons.

On 19 June 2019, Bejan signed a contract with Dinamo București. He was loaned at Academica Clinceni in February 2020.

Honours

ASA Târgu Mureș
Supercupa României: 2015

Astra Giurgiu
Cupa României runner-up: 2018–19

References

External links
 
 
 Profile at official club website
 

1991 births
Living people
People from Mangalia
Romanian footballers
Association football defenders
Romania under-21 international footballers
Romania youth international footballers
FC Viitorul Constanța players
ASA 2013 Târgu Mureș players
MKS Cracovia (football) players
CS Concordia Chiajna players
FC Astra Giurgiu players
FC Dinamo București players
LPS HD Clinceni players
FC Hermannstadt players
Liga I players
Liga II players
Ekstraklasa players
Romanian expatriate footballers
Expatriate footballers in Poland
Romanian expatriate sportspeople in Poland